Bitty may refer to:

 Bitty McLean (born 1972), British reggae, lovers rock and ragga singer
 Bitty Schram (born 1968), American actress
 Eric "Bitty" Bittle, protagonist of the webcomic Check, Please!

See also
 Bitti, an Italian comune
 Bitti (name), a list of people with the surname or given name
 Tendai Biti (born 1966), Zimbabwean politician, Minister of Finance from 2009 to 2013
 Château de Bity, France

Lists of people by nickname